The Big Boggy National Wildlife Refuge is a wildlife conservation area along the coast of Texas (USA) in southeastern Matagorda County, south of the towns of Bay City and Wadsworth. It borders a bay behind a barrier island at the Gulf of Mexico. Established in 1983 and encompassing  of salt marsh.

Big Boggy National Wildlife Refuge is for the birds. The refuge is only open to the public for waterfowl hunting season and for special activities.

Three national wildlife refuges on the Texas coast - Brazoria, San Bernard and Big Boggy - form a vital complex of coastal wetlands harboring more than 300 bird species.

Notes

References

External links
 Big Boggy National Wildlife Refuge

Protected areas of Matagorda County, Texas
National Wildlife Refuges in Texas
Wetlands of Texas
Landforms of Matagorda County, Texas
Protected areas established in 1983
1983 establishments in Texas